Kozhukhar is a surname of Ukrainian origin. Notable people with the surname include:

Andriy Kozhukhar (born 1999), Ukrainian footballer
Volodymyr Kozhukhar (1941–2022), Soviet-Ukrainian conductor and music educator

Ukrainian-language surnames